Mendel Elefant (also known as Emanuel Elefant, September 6, 1906 – 1942?) was a Jewish Romanian/Czechoslovakian Yiddish-language poet, writer, artist & journalist.

Biography
Mendel was born in the town of Vișeu de Sus, Austria-Hungary. He was the son of Rabbi Dov Berish Elefant and his wife Bava Elefant (née Eisenberger). His father, a rabbi and a dayan (religious judge), was fluent in six languages, and was a bank manager for many years. His mother, Bava, was a businesswoman, and was the mother of 12 children, while some children died at an early age. When Mendel was 11 years old his mother died of liver cancer, and his father remarried later on.

Mendel studied at the local Talmud Torah at Vișeu de Sus, and continued on to study at the Yeshivot  of Northern Romania and Czechoslovakia, one of them being the Yeshiva of Siget. During his adult years he moved to Czechoslovakia and lived there.
During the 1920s, Mendel immigrated to Brazil, to the city of Rio de Janeiro, in order to save money towards his upcoming marriage with his fiancée, whom he married upon his return to Czechoslovakia. While in Rio de Janeiro, Mendel published poems and literary articles in local journals and newspapers.
In Czechoslovakia, between the two world wars, Mendel worked as a journalist in Yiddish newspapers in the cities of Munkács and Košice.

In 1929 Mendel was the editor of a literary weekly named "Der Fackl"  that appeared in Košice. Additionally, he edited another weekly named "Der Kantshik", and in 1933 he became the editor of "Dus Yiddishe Vort" in Košice, named in Hungarian "zsidó szó", which was well known at the time.

During the late 1930s, Mendel was a journalist in the city of Lvov in Poland, at a local Yiddish newspaper.

During the Nazi invasion and the outbreak of World War II, Mendel was on a mission in Warsaw and fled towards Lithuania. His wife and child in Lvov fled to Lithuania as well, and they were reunited in Vilna. Mendel had been walking in the snow for a long period of time, he developed gangrene and once he arrived in Vilna - the doctors had to amputate his toes, among other things.

Later, his health continued to deteriorate, and he couldn't continue to run and was caught by the Germans. The year of death is estimated at 1942.

His wife, Ilonka Elefant, and his young son who was approximately 10 years old (known fondly as "Pindichku"), continued to run until they were eventually intercepted by the Germans and were taken to a concentration camp. Upon arrival at the camp, a Nazi officer noticed the boy who was very handsome and had light blonde hair and blue eyes, and was a talented violinist. He took the boy to his house as a companion for his own son who was his age.

Ilonka Elefant perished in the camps, but managed to smuggle out a letter to her sister in hiding through a non-Jewish woman who worked at the camp every day, telling her what had befallen her son.and asking that she find him once the opportunity arose.

After the War, Ilonka's sister went to wealthy relatives in South America and they hired private investigators who were able to trace this Nazi Officer from camp to camp, but ultimately lost track of him when the war ended and the camps dissolved.  No one knows what happened to the child, and it was assumed that the Nazi officer had eventually killed him.

References

1906 births
1942 deaths
People from Vișeu de Sus
People from the Kingdom of Hungary
Romanian Jews
Jewish poets
Yiddish-language poets
Yiddish-language journalists
Romanian Jews who died in the Holocaust
Romanian civilians killed in World War II
Romanian emigrants to Czechoslovakia
Czechoslovak emigrants to Brazil